The joint decision trap was identified by the political scientist, Fritz W. Scharpf in a 1988 scholarly article,  It is understood to be a situation in which there is a tendency for government decisions to be taken at the lowest common denominator in situations where the decision-makers have the ability to veto the proposals. It is a common challenge for federal governments such as Germany and the European Union.

See also 
 Anticipatory thinking

References

Further reading 
 Peter F. Drucker; Harvard Business Review on Decision Making (2001); 
 John S. Hammond; Smart Choices: A Practical Guide to Making Better Decisions (2002); 
 Edward Russo, Paul J.H. Schoemaker; Decision Traps (1990) 
 Paul J.H. Schoemaker; Winning Decisions: Getting It Right the First Time (2001); 

Strategic management
Systems thinking
Business planning